Cylindrocladiella camelliae is a fungal plant pathogen that causes root rot in tea.

References

External links

Tea diseases
Fungal plant pathogens and diseases
Nectriaceae
Fungi described in 1961